USS Montgomery may refer to:

  was a frigate that was never completed during the Revolutionary War.
  was a sloop or schooner in service from 1813 to 1815.
  was a screw-driven steamer in service from 1861 to 1865.
  was an unprotected cruiser in service between 1891 and 1918.
  was a destroyer commissioned in 1918 and later converted to a minelayer. Served in World War II, and sold for scrap in 1946.
  is an  commissioned in 2016

See also
  was a destroyer escort, later redesignated a frigate. Launched in November 1970 and decommissioned in June 1993.
  was a World War II Landing Ship, Tank.
 Sloop Montgomery was an American privateer during the War for Independence commissioned by the State of New York
  was a Liberty ship that was wrecked off Sheerness, England, with thousands of tons of ammunition on board.

United States Navy ship names